"Lullaby" is a song by English singer Melanie B, released as the final single from her debut solo album, Hot (2000). It was released on 4 June 2001 and peaked at  13 on the UK Singles Chart. The music video and single cover feature her daughter Phoenix Chi Gulzar. The song was co-written by Melanie Brown, Richard Stannard, Julian Gallagher, and Richard Norris.

Reception
The media criticised Brown for using her child in the music video and single artwork, labelling her "Desperate Spice" and insinuating that she was exploiting her child as a marketing tool. The single entered and peaked at No. 13 on the UK Singles Chart and garnered mixed reviews by Nigel Packer of BBC.

Music video
The music video was filmed in Morocco and was shot on 13 and 14 April 2001. The video features Melanie walking down an alleyway singing and at one point helping a child tie his shoes. The video ends with Melanie walking onto a beach singing the end of the song. Shots of Melanie with her daughter Phoenix Chi are shown throughout the video.

Track listings
 UK and European enhanced CD single
 "Lullaby" – 3:26
 "Lullaby"  – 3:49
 "Feels So Good"  – 6:40
 "Lullaby"  – 3:25

 European CD single
 "Lullaby" – 3:25
 "Lullaby"  – 3:49

Charts

References

2000 songs
2001 singles
Mel B songs
Songs about parenthood
Songs written by Julian Gallagher
Songs written by Mel B
Songs written by Richard Stannard (songwriter)
Virgin Records singles